Cosmophasis albipes is a species of jumping spider in the genus Cosmophasis.The type specimen of the species is a female, collected on 1 August in nowadays Guinea.

Description
The females' cephalothorax is light fawn, the cephalic part has a large black spot that covers the posterior eyes, arching before the dimple, the thoracic part having a blackish oblique zone. Chelicerae are brown, darker than cephalothorax, mouthparts are very fawn, and abdomen is whitish, with four white-speckled blackish lines, the first pair going to the middle, the last touching the spinnerets, and black hairs. Both the underside and spinnerets are white.

Distribution
The type locality is from Macenta, French Guinea.

Taxonomy
It is assigned to the genus Cosmophasis due to having lateral spines on the anterior metatarsals. It is closely related with the genus Telamonia.

References

Salticidae